The 2011 IIHF World Championship Division III was an international ice hockey tournament run by the International Ice Hockey Federation. The tournament was contested between April 11–17, 2011 in Cape Town, South Africa. Prior to the start of the tournament, the Mongolian national team announced they would withdraw, citing financial reasons. All games against them were counted as a forfeit, with a score of 5–0 for the opposing team.

Israel won all five of its games by a combined score of 57-9, and was promoted to the 2012 IIHF World Championship Division II. Israel's Eliezer Sherbatov led the tournament in points, goals, assists, and +/-, earning 26 points (14 goals + 12 assists) in four games. He was named the best forward of the tournament.

Participants

Tournament

Standings

Fixtures
All times local.

Officials
The IIHF selected 4 referees and 7 linesmen to work the 2011 IIHF World Championship Div III. They were the following:

Referees
  Maksym Urda
  Claudio Pianezze
  Chris Deweerdt
  Mikhal Buturlin

Linesmen
  Jos Korte
  Arkadiy Subbotin
  Ulrich Pardatscher
  Jacques Riisom-Birker
  Nickolas Beukes
  Seung Won Jung
  Mikulash Furnadziev

Statistics

Scoring leaders
List shows the top 10 skaters sorted by points, then goals.

GP = Games played; G = Goals; A = Assists; Pts = Points; +/− = Plus/minus; PIM = Penalties in minutes; POS = PositionSource: IIHF.com

Leading goaltenders
Only the top five goaltenders, based on save percentage, who have played 40% of their team's minutes are included in this list.
TOI = Time on ice (minutes:seconds); SA = Shots against; GA = Goals against; GAA = Goals against average; Sv% = Save percentage; SO = ShutoutsSource: IIHF.com

Awards
 Best players selected by the directorate  
Best Goaltender:  David Berger
Best Forward:  Eliezer Sherbatov
Best Defenceman:  Daniel Spivak

 Best players
Best player of each team selected by the coaches.
  Kyriakos Adamidis
  Tal Avneri
  Georges Scheier
  Ian Ashworth
  Emrah Ozmen

References

2011
4
2011 in South African ice hockey
2010–11 in Israeli ice hockey
2010–11 in Greek ice hockey
2010–11 in Turkish ice hockey
2011
April 2011 sports events in Africa
2010s in Cape Town
Sports competitions in Cape Town